Saint Paul (abbreviated St. Paul) is the capital of the U.S. state of Minnesota and the county seat of Ramsey County. Situated on high bluffs overlooking a bend in the Mississippi River, Saint Paul is a regional business hub and the center of Minnesota's government. The Minnesota State Capitol and the state government offices all sit on a hill close to the city's downtown district. One of the oldest cities in Minnesota, Saint Paul has several historic neighborhoods and landmarks, such as the Summit Avenue Neighborhood, the James J. Hill House, and the Cathedral of Saint Paul. Like the adjacent and larger city of Minneapolis, Saint Paul is known for its cold, snowy winters and humid summers.

According to census estimates, in 2021 the city's population was 307,193, making it the 67th-largest city in the United States, the 12th-most populous in the Midwest, and the second-most populous in Minnesota. Most of the city lies east of the Mississippi River near its confluence with the Minnesota River. Minneapolis is mostly across the Mississippi River to the west. Together, they are known as the "Twin Cities" and make up the core of Minneapolis–Saint Paul metropolitan area, the third most populous metro in the Midwest.

The Legislative Assembly of the Minnesota Territory established the Town of St. Paul as its capital near existing Dakota Sioux settlements in November 1849. It remained a town until 1854. The Dakota name for where Saint Paul is situated is "Imnizaska" for the "white rock" bluffs along the river. The city has two sports venues: Xcel Energy Center, home to the Minnesota Wild, and Allianz Field, home to Minnesota United.

Saint Paul has a mayor–council government. The current mayor is Melvin Carter III, who was first elected in 2018.

History

Burial mounds in present-day Indian Mounds Park suggest the area was inhabited by the Hopewell Native Americans about 2,000 years ago. From the early 17th century to 1837, the Mdewakanton Dakota, a tribe of the Sioux, lived near the mounds after being displaced from their ancestral grounds by Mille Lacs Lake from advancing Ojibwe. The Dakota called the area Imniza-Ska ("white cliffs") for its exposed white sandstone cliffs on the river's eastern side. The Imniza-Ska were full of caves that were useful to the Dakota. The explorer Jonathan Carver documented the historic Wakan tipi in the bluff below the burial mounds in 1767. In the Menominee language St. Paul was called Sāēnepān-Menīkān, which means "ribbon, silk or satin village", suggesting its role in trade throughout the region after the introduction of European goods.

A military reservation was intended for the confluence of the Mississippi and Minnesota rivers on both sides of the Mississippi up to Saint Anthony Falls. All of what is now the Highland park neighborhood was included in this. Pike planned a second military reservation at the confluence of the St. Croix and Mississippi rivers. In 1819, Fort Snelling was built at the Minnesota and Mississippi confluence. The 1837 Treaty with the Sioux ceded all tribal lands east of the Mississippi to the U.S. government. Chief Little Crow III moved his village, Kaposia, from south of Mounds Park across the river a few miles onto Dakota land. Fur traders, explorers, and settlers came to the area for the fort's security. Many were French-Canadians who predated American pioneers by some time. A whiskey trade flourished among the squatters and the fort's commander evicted them all from the fort's reservation. Fur trader turned bootlegger "Pig's Eye" Parrant, who set up business just outside the reservation, particularly irritated the commander. By the early 1840s, a community had developed nearby that locals called Pig's Eye (French: L'Œil du Cochon) or Pig's Eye Landing after Parrant's popular tavern. In 1842, a raiding party of Ojibwe attacked the Kaposia encampment south of St. Paul. A battle ensued where a creek drained into wetlands two miles south of Wakan Tipi. The creek was thereafter called Battle Creek and is today parkland. In the 1840s-70s the Métis brought their oxen and Red River Carts down Kellogg Street to Lambert's landing to send buffalo hides to market from the Red River of the North. St. Paul was the southern terminus of the Red River Trails. In 1840, Pierre Bottineau became a prominent resident with a claim near the settlement's center.

In 1841, Catholic missionary Lucien Galtier was sent to minister to the French Canadians at Mendota. He had a chapel he named for St. Paul built on the bluff above the riverboat landing downriver from Fort Snelling. Galtier informed the settlers that they were to adopt the chapel's name for the settlement and cease the use of "Pigs Eye". In 1847, New York educator Harriet Bishop moved to the settlement and opened the city's first school. The Minnesota Territory was created in 1849 with Saint Paul as the capital. The U.S. Army made the territory's first improved road, Point Douglas Fort Ripley Military Road, in 1850. It passed through what became St. Paul neighborhoods. In 1857, the territorial legislature voted to move the capital to Saint Peter, but Joe Rolette, a territorial legislator, stole the text of the bill and went into hiding, preventing the move.

The year 1858 saw more than 1,000 steamboats service Saint Paul, making it a gateway for settlers to the Minnesota frontier or Dakota Territory. Geography was a primary reason the city became a transportation hub. The location was the last good point to land riverboats coming upriver due to the river valley's topography. For a time, Saint Paul was called "The Last City of the East." Fort Snelling was important to St. Paul from the start. Direct access from St. Paul did not happen until the 7th bridge was built in 1880. Before that, there was a cable ferry crossing dating to at latest the 1840s. Once streetcars appeared, a new bridge to St. Paul was built in 1904. Until the town built its first jail the fort's brig served St. Paul. Industrialist James J. Hill founded his railroad empire in St. Paul. The Great Northern Railway and the Northern Pacific Railway were both headquartered in St. Paul until they merged with the Burlington Northern. Today they are part of the BNSF Railway.

On August 20, 1904, severe thunderstorms and tornadoes damaged hundreds of downtown buildings, causing $1.78 million ($ million today) in damages and ripping spans from the High Bridge. During the 1960s, in conjunction with urban renewal, Saint Paul razed neighborhoods west of downtown for the creation of the interstate freeway system. From 1959 to 1961, the Rondo Neighborhood was demolished for the construction of Interstate 94. The loss of that African American enclave brought attention to racial segregation and unequal housing in northern cities. The annual Rondo Days celebration commemorates the African American community.

Downtown St. Paul had skyscraper-building booms beginning in the 1970s. Because the city center is directly beneath the flight path into the airport across the river there is a height restriction for all construction. The tallest buildings, such as Galtier Plaza (Jackson and Sibley Towers), The Pointe of Saint Paul condominiums, and the city's tallest building, Wells Fargo Place (formerly Minnesota World Trade Center), were constructed in the late 1980s. In the 1990s and 2000s, the tradition of bringing new immigrant groups to the city continued. As of 2004, nearly 10% of the city's population were recent Hmong immigrants from Vietnam, Laos, Cambodia, Thailand, and Myanmar. Saint Paul is the location of the Hmong Archives.

Geography

Saint Paul's history and growth as a landing port are tied to water. The city's defining physical characteristic, the confluence of the Mississippi and Minnesota Rivers, was carved into the region during the last ice age, as were the steep river bluffs and dramatic palisades on which the city is built. Receding glaciers and Lake Agassiz forced torrents of water from a glacial river that served the river valleys. The city is situated in east-central Minnesota.

The Mississippi River forms a municipal boundary on part of the city's west, southwest, and southeast sides. Minneapolis, the state's largest city, lies to the west. Falcon Heights, Lauderdale, Roseville, and Maplewood are north, with Maplewood lying to the east. The cities of West Saint Paul and South Saint Paul are to the south, as are Lilydale, Mendota, and Mendota Heights, across the river from the city. The city's largest lakes are Pig's Eye Lake, which is part of the Mississippi, Lake Phalen, and Lake Como.

The Parks and Recreation department is responsible for 160 parks and 41 recreation centers. The city ranked #2 in park access and quality, after only Minneapolis, in the 2018 ParkScore ranking of the top 100 park systems across the United States according to the nonprofit Trust for Public Land.

Neighborhoods

Saint Paul's Department of Planning and Economic Development divides Saint Paul into seventeen Planning Districts, created in 1979 to allow neighborhoods to participate in governance and use Community Development Block Grants. With a funding agreement directly from the city, the councils share a pool of funds. The councils have significant land-use control, a voice in guiding development, and they organize residents. The boundaries are adjusted depending on population changes; as such, they sometimes overlap established neighborhoods. Though these neighborhoods changed over time, preservationists have saved many of their historically significant structures.

The city's 17 Planning Districts are:

 Sunray-Battle Creek-Highwood
 Greater East Side
 West Side
 Dayton's Bluff
 Payne-Phalen
 North End
 Thomas Dale (Frogtown)
 Summit-University
 West Seventh
 Como Park
 Hamline-Midway
 Saint Anthony Park
 Union Park
 Macalester-Groveland
 Highland Park
 Summit Hill
 Downtown

Climate

Saint Paul has a humid continental climate typical of the Upper Midwestern United States. Winters are frigid and snowy, while summers are warm to hot and humid. On the Köppen climate classification, Saint Paul falls in the hot summer humid continental climate zone (Dfa). The city experiences a full range of precipitation and related weather events, including snow, sleet, ice, rain, thunderstorms, tornadoes, and fog.

Due to its northerly location and lack of large bodies of water to moderate the air, Saint Paul is sometimes subjected to cold Arctic air masses, especially during late December, January, and February. The average annual temperature of  gives the Minneapolis−Saint Paul metropolitan area the coldest annual mean temperature of any major metropolitan area in the continental U.S.

Demographics

2020 census
As of the census of 2020, the population was 311,527. In terms of race, the city's population was 50.5% White, 19.2% Asian, 16.8% Black or African American, 1.0% Native American, 4.8% from other races, and 7.6% from two or more races. Residents of Hispanic or Latino ancestry, of any race, made up 9.7% of the population.

The 2020 census of the city included 291 people incarcerated in adult correctional facilities and 5,640 people in student housing.

According to the American Community Survey estimates for 2016-2020, the median income for a household in the city was $59,717, and the median income for a family was $74,852. Male full-time workers had a median income of $50,186 versus $45,541 for female workers. The per capita income was $32,779. About 13.2% of families and 17.9% of the population were below the poverty line, including 27.0% of those under age 18 and 10.1% of those age 65 or over. Of the population age 25 and over, 87.6% were high school graduates or higher and 41.3% had a bachelor's degree or higher.

2010 census
As of the 2010 census, there were 285,068 people, 111,001 households, and 59,689 families residing in the city. The racial makeup of the city was 60.1% white, 15.7% African American, 1.1% Native American, 15.0% Asian, 0.1% Pacific Islander, 3.9% from other races, and 4.2% from two or more races. Hispanic or Latino people of any race were 9.6% of the population.

There were 111,001 households, of which 30.4% had children under the age of 18 living with them, 34.1% were married couples living together, 14.8% had a female householder with no husband present, 4.9% had a male householder with no wife present, and 46.2% were non-families. 35.8% of all households were made up of individuals, and 8.5% had someone living alone who was 65 years of age or older. The average household size was 2.47 and the average family size was 3.33.

The median age in the city was 30.9 years. 25.1% of residents were under the age of 18; 13.9% were between the ages of 18 and 24; 29.6% were from 25 to 44; 22.6% were from 45 to 64; and 9% were 65 years of age or older. The gender makeup of the city was 48.9% male and 51.1% female.

Ethnic history
The earliest known inhabitants of the St. Paul area, from about 400 AD, were members of the Hopewell tradition, who buried their dead in mounds on the river bluffs (now Indian Mounds Park). The next known inhabitants were the Mdewakanton Dakota in the 17th century, who fled their ancestral home of Mille Lacs Lake in central Minnesota in response to westward expansion of the Ojibwe nation. The Ojibwe later occupied the north (east) bank of the Mississippi River.

By 1800, French-Canadian explorers came through the region and attracted fur traders. Fort Snelling and Pig's Eye Tavern also brought the first Yankees from New England and English, Irish, and Scottish immigrants, who had enlisted in the army and settled nearby after discharge. These early settlers and entrepreneurs built houses on the heights north of the river. The first wave of immigration came with the Irish, who settled at Connemara Patch along the Mississippi, named for their home, Connemara, Ireland. The Irish became prolific in politics, city governance, and public safety, much to the chagrin of the Germans and French, who had grown into the majority. In 1850, the first of many groups of Swedish immigrants passed through St. Paul on their way to farming communities in northern and western regions of the territory. A large group settled in Swede Hollow, which later became home to Poles, Italians, and Mexicans. The last Swedish presence moved up St. Paul's East Side along Payne Avenue in the 1950s.

Of people who specified European ancestry in the 2005–07 American Community Survey of St. Paul, 26.4% were German, 13.8% Irish, 8.4% Norwegian, 7.0% Swedish, and 6.2% English. There is also a visible community of people of Sub-Saharan African ancestry, representing 4.2% of the population. By the 1980s, the Thomas-Dale area, once an Austro-Hungarian enclave known as Frogtown (German: Froschburg), became home to Vietnamese people who had left their war-torn country. A settlement program for the Hmong diaspora came soon after, and by 2000, St. Paul had the largest urban Hmong contingent in the nation. Mexican immigrants have settled in St. Paul's West Side since the 1930s; Mexico opened a foreign consulate there in 2005.

Most St. Paul residents claiming religious affiliation are Christian, split between the Roman Catholic Church and various Protestant denominations. The Roman Catholic presence comes from Irish, German, Scottish, and French Canadian settlers, later bolstered by Hispanic immigrants. There are Jewish synagogues such as Mount Zion Temple and relatively small populations of Hindus, Muslims, and Buddhists. The city has been dubbed "paganistan" due to its large Wiccan population.

Economy

The Minneapolis–Saint Paul–Bloomington area employs 1,570,700 people in the private sector as of July 2008, 82.43% of whom work in private service providing-related jobs.

Major corporations headquartered in Saint Paul include Ecolab, a chemical and cleaning product company that the Minneapolis/St. Paul Business Journal named in 2008 as the eighth-best place to work in the Twin Cites for companies with 1,000 full-time Minnesota employees, and Securian Financial Group Inc.

The 3M Company moved to St. Paul in 1910. It built an art deco headquarters at 900 Bush that still stands. Headquarters operations moved to the Maplewood campus in 1964. 3M manufacturing continued for a couple more decades until all St. Paul operations ceased.

The city was home to the Ford Motor Company's Twin Cities Assembly Plant, which opened in 1924 and closed at the end of 2011. The plant was in Highland Park on the Mississippi River, adjacent to Lock and Dam No. 1, Mississippi River, which generates hydroelectric power. The site is being redeveloped into a mixed-used area called Highland Bridge which, when complete, will include 3,800 housing units, most opening in 2023.

Saint Paul has financed city development with tax increment financing (TIF). In 2018, it had 55 TIF districts. Projects that have benefited from TIF funding include the St. Paul Saints stadium, and the affordable housing along the Twin Cities Metro Green Line.

Housing
In November 2021, Saint Paul became the only Midwestern city to regulate rent increases when voters passed a rent control ordinance as part of a larger effort to curb rising housing costs. The law limited annual rent increases to three percent and prohibited higher increases after a tenant vacated a unit. In September 2022, the Saint Paul City Council voted to amend the law, allowing higher vacancy increases and exempting units built in the preceding or following 20 years from the increase cap.

Culture

Every January, Saint Paul hosts the Saint Paul Winter Carnival, a tradition that began in 1886 when a New York reporter called Saint Paul "another Siberia". The organizers had a model in the Montreal Winter Carnival the year before. Architect A. C. Hutchinson designed the Montreal ice castle and was hired to design St. Paul's first. The event has now been held 135 times with an attendance of 350,000. It includes an ice sculpting competition, a snow sculpting competition, a medallion treasure hunt, food, activities, and an ice palace when it can be arranged. The Como Zoo and Conservatory and adjoining Japanese Garden are popular year-round. The historic Landmark Center in downtown Saint Paul hosts cultural and arts organizations. The city's recreation sites include Indian Mounds Park, Battle Creek Regional Park, Harriet Island Regional Park, Highland Park, the Wabasha Street Caves, Lake Como, Lake Phalen, and Rice Park, as well as several areas abutting the Mississippi River. The Irish Fair of Minnesota is held annually at the Harriet Island Pavilion area. The country's largest Hmong American sports festival, the Freedom Festival, is held the first weekend of July at McMurray Field near Como Park.

The city is associated with the Minnesota State Fair in neighboring Falcon Heights just west of Como Park. The fair dates to before statehood. With the competing interests of Minneapolis and St. Paul, it was held on "neutral ground" between both.  That area refused to become part of St. Paul or Roseville and became Falcon Heights in the 1950s. The University of Minnesota Saint Paul Campus is actually in Falcon Heights.

Fort Snelling is often identified as being in St. Paul but is actually its own unorganized territory. The eastern part of Fort Snelling Unorganized Territory (MSP included) has a St. Paul mailing address. The western side has a Minneapolis ZIP code.

Saint Paul is the birthplace of cartoonist Charles M. Schulz, who lived in Merriam Park from infancy until 1960. Schulz's Peanuts inspired giant, decorated sculptures around the city, a Chamber of Commerce promotion in the late 1990s. Other notable residents include writer F. Scott Fitzgerald and playwright August Wilson, who premiered many of the ten plays in his Pittsburgh Cycle at the local Penumbra Theater.

The Ordway Center for the Performing Arts hosts theater productions and the Minnesota Opera is a founding tenant. RiverCentre, attached to Xcel Energy Center, serves as the city's convention center. The city has contributed to the music of Minnesota and the Twin Cities music scene through various venues. Great jazz musicians have passed through the influential Artists' Quarter, first established in the 1970s in Whittier, Minneapolis, and moved to downtown Saint Paul in 1994. Artists' Quarter also hosts the Soapboxing Poetry Slam, home of the 2009 National Poetry Slam Champions. At The Black Dog, in Lowertown, many French or European jazz musicians (Evan Parker, Tony Hymas, Benoît Delbecq, François Corneloup) have met Twin Cities musicians and started new groups touring in Europe. Groups and performers such as Fantastic Merlins, Dean Magraw/Davu Seru, Merciless Ghosts, and Willie Murphy are regulars. The Turf Club in Midway has been a music scene landmark since the 1940s. Saint Paul is also the home base of the internationally acclaimed Rose Ensemble. As an Irish stronghold, the city boasts popular Irish pubs with live music, such as Shamrocks, The Dubliner, and until its closure in 2019, O'Gara's. The internationally acclaimed Saint Paul Chamber Orchestra is the nation's only full-time professional chamber orchestra. The Minnesota Centennial Showboat on the Mississippi River began in 1958 with Minnesota's first centennial celebration.

Saint Paul hosts a number of museums, including the University of Minnesota's Goldstein Museum of Design, the Minnesota Children's Museum, the Schubert Club Museum of Musical Instruments, the Minnesota Museum of American Art, the Traces Center for History and Culture, the Minnesota History Center, the Alexander Ramsey House, the James J. Hill House, the Minnesota Transportation Museum, the Science Museum of Minnesota, and the Twin City Model Railroad Museum.

Sports

The Saint Paul division of Parks and Recreation runs over 1,500 organized sports teams.

Saint Paul hosts a number of professional, semi-professional, and amateur sports teams. The Minnesota Wild play their home games in downtown Saint Paul's Xcel Energy Center, which opened in 2000. The Wild brought the NHL back to Minnesota for the first time since 1993, when the Minnesota North Stars left the state for Dallas, Texas. (The World Hockey Association's Minnesota Fighting Saints played in Saint Paul from 1972 to 1977.) Citing the history of hockey in the Twin Cities and teams at all levels, Sports Illustrated called Saint Paul the new Hockeytown U.S.A. in 2007.

The Xcel Energy Center, a multipurpose entertainment and sports venue, can host concerts and accommodate nearly all sporting events. It occupies the site of the demolished Saint Paul Civic Center. The Xcel Energy Center hosts the Minnesota high school boys hockey tournament, the Minnesota high school girls' volleyball tournament, and concerts throughout the year. In 2004, it was named the best overall sports venue in the US by ESPN.

The St. Paul Saints are the city's Minor League Baseball team, which plays in the International League as an affiliate of the Minnesota Twins. There have been several different teams called the Saints over the years. Founded in 1884, they were shut down in 1961 after the Minnesota Twins moved to Bloomington. The Saints were brought back in 1993 as an independent baseball team in the Northern League, moving to the American Association in 2006. They joined affiliated baseball in 2021. Their home games are played at the open-air CHS Field in downtown's Lowertown Historic District. Four noted Major League All-Star baseball players are natives of Saint Paul: Hall of Fame outfielder Dave Winfield, Hall of Fame infielder Paul Molitor, Hall of Fame pitcher Jack Morris, and first baseman Joe Mauer. The all-black St. Paul Colored Gophers played four seasons in Saint Paul from 1907 to 1911.

The St. Paul Twin Stars of the National Premier Soccer League play their home games at Macalester Stadium. St. Paul's first curling club was founded in 1888. The current club, the St. Paul Curling Club, was founded in 1912 and is the largest curling club in the United States. Minnesota Roller Derby is a flat-track roller derby league based in the Roy Wilkins Auditorium, made up of women and gender expansive athletes. Minnesota's oldest athletic organization, the Minnesota Boat Club, resides in the Mississippi River on Raspberry Island. Saint Paul is also home to Circus Juventas, the largest circus arts school in North America.

On March 25, 2015, Major League Soccer announced that it had awarded its 23rd MLS franchise to Minnesota United FC, a team from the lower-level North American Soccer League. Bill McGuire and his ownership group, which includes Jim Pohlad of the Minnesota Twins, Glen Taylor of the Minnesota Timberwolves, former Minnesota Wild investor Glen Nelson, and his daughter Wendy Carlson Nelson of the Carlson hospitality company, had intended to build a privately financed soccer-specific stadium in Downtown Minneapolis near the Minneapolis Farmer's Market. But their plan was met with heavy opposition from former Minneapolis Mayor Betsy Hodges, who said her city was suffering from "stadium fatigue" after building three stadiums for the Minnesota Twins, Minnesota Vikings and the Minnesota Golden Gophers, within a six-year span. On July 1, 2015, after failing to reach an agreement with the city of Minneapolis, McGuire and his partners turned their focus to Saint Paul.

On October 23, 2015, Bill McGuire of Minnesota United FC and former Saint Paul Mayor Chris Coleman announced that a privately financed soccer-specific stadium would be built on the vacant Metro Transit bus barn site in Saint Paul's Midway neighborhood near the intersection of Snelling Avenue and University Avenue. It is midway between downtown Saint Paul and downtown Minneapolis. The stadium, Allianz Field, opened in April 2019 and seats 19,400. The team began playing in the MLS in 2017.

On May 15, 2018, the Minnesota Whitecaps joined the Premier Hockey Federation (the former National Women's Hockey League) as its fifth franchise. Founded in 2004, the team originally played in the Western Women's Hockey League before going independent in 2010 when that league folded. The Whitecaps play their home games at TRIA Rink, a 1,200-seat arena and practice facility in downtown Saint Paul. The team began playing in the PHF in 2018.

The Timberwolves, Twins, Vikings, and Lynx all play in Minneapolis.

Government and politics

Saint Paul has a variant of the strong mayor–council form of government. The mayor is the chief executive and chief administrative officer of the city and the seven-member city council is its legislative body. The mayor is elected by the entire city, while members of the city council are elected from seven different geographic wards of approximately equal population. Both the mayor and council members serve four-year terms. The current mayor is Melvin Carter (DFL), Saint Paul's first African-American mayor. Aside from Norm Coleman, who became a Republican during his second term, Saint Paul has not elected a Republican mayor since 1952.

The city is also the county seat of Ramsey County, named for Alexander Ramsey, the state's first governor. The county once spanned much of the present-day metropolitan area and was originally to be named Saint Paul County after the city. Today it is geographically the smallest county and the most densely populated. Ramsey is the only home rule county in Minnesota; the seven-member Board of Commissioners appoints a county manager whose office is in the combination city hall/county courthouse along with the Minnesota Second Judicial Courts. The nearby Law Enforcement Center houses the Ramsey County Sheriff's office.

State and federal

Saint Paul is the capital of Minnesota. The city hosts the capitol building, designed by Saint Paul resident Cass Gilbert, and the House and Senate office buildings. The Minnesota Governor's Residence, which is used for some state functions, is on Summit Avenue. The Minnesota Democratic-Farmer-Labor Party (affiliated with the Democratic Party) is headquartered in Saint Paul. Numerous state departments and services are also headquartered in Saint Paul, such as the Minnesota Department of Natural Resources.

The city is split into four Minnesota Senate districts (64, 65, 66 and 67) and eight Minnesota House of Representatives districts (64A, 64B, 65A, 65B, 66A, 66B, 67A and 67B), all of which are held by Democrats.

Saint Paul is the heart of Minnesota's 4th congressional district, represented by Democrat Betty McCollum. The district has been in DFL hands without interruption since 1949. Minnesota is represented in the US Senate by Democrat Amy Klobuchar, a former Hennepin County Attorney, and Democrat Tina Smith, former Lieutenant Governor of Minnesota.

*District also includes Falcon Heights, Lauderdale and Roseville.

Education

Saint Paul is second in the United States in the number of higher education institutions per capita, behind Boston. Higher education institutions that call Saint Paul home include three public and eight private colleges and universities and five post-secondary institutions. Well-known colleges and universities include the Saint Catherine University, Concordia University, Hamline University, Macalester College, and the University of St. Thomas. Metropolitan State University and Saint Paul College, which focus on non-traditional students, are based in Saint Paul, as well as a law school, Mitchell Hamline School of Law.

The Saint Paul Public Schools district is the state's largest school district and serves approximately 39,000 students. The district is extremely diverse with students from families speaking 90 different languages, although only five languages are used for most school communication: English, Spanish, Hmong, Karen, and Somali. The district runs 82 different schools, including 52 elementary schools, 12 middle schools, seven high schools, ten alternative schools, and one special education school, employing over 6,500 teachers and staff. The school district also oversees community education programs for pre-K and adult learners, including Early Childhood Family Education, GED Diploma, language programs, and various learning opportunities for community members of all ages. In 2006, Saint Paul Public Schools celebrated its 150th anniversary. Some students attend public schools in other school districts chosen by their families under Minnesota's open enrollment statute.

A variety of K-12 private, parochial, and public charter schools are also represented in the city. In 1992, Saint Paul became the first city in the US to sponsor and open a charter school, now found in most states across the nation. Saint Paul is currently home to 21 charter schools as well as 38 private schools. The Saint Paul Public Library system includes a central library, twelve branch locations, and a bookmobile.

Media

Residents of Saint Paul can receive 10 broadcast television stations, five of which broadcast from within Saint Paul. One daily newspaper, the St. Paul Pioneer Press, two weekly neighborhood newspapers, the East Side Review and City Pages (owned by The Star Tribune Company), and several monthly or semimonthly neighborhood papers serve the city. It was the only city in the United States with a population of 250,000 or more to see an increase in circulation of Sunday newspapers in 2007. Several media outlets based in neighboring Minneapolis also serve the Saint Paul community, including the Star Tribune. Saint Paul is home to Minnesota Public Radio (MPR), a three-format system that broadcasts on nearly 40 stations around the Midwest. MPR locally delivers news and information, classical, and The Current (which plays a wide variety of music). The station has 110,000 regional members and more than 800,000 listeners each week throughout the Upper Midwest, the largest audience of any regional public radio network. Also operating as part of American Public Media, MPR's programming reaches five million listeners, most notably through Live from Here, hosted by Chris Thile (previously known as A Prairie Home Companion, hosted by Garrison Keillor, who also lives in the city). The Fitzgerald Theater, renamed in 1994 for Saint Paul native and novelist F. Scott Fitzgerald, is home to the show.

Transportation

Interstate and roadways

Interstate Highways
 Interstate 35E
 Interstate 94

US Highways
 US 10
 US 52
 US 61

Minnesota Highways
 Highway 5
 Highway 51
 Highway 280

Residents use Interstate 35E running north–south and Interstate 94 running east–west. Trunk highways include U.S. Highway 52, Minnesota State Highway 280, and Minnesota State Highway 5. St. Paul has several unique roads such as Ayd Mill Road, Phalen Boulevard and Shepard Road/Warner Road, which diagonally follow particular geographic features in the city. Biking is also gaining popularity, due to the creation of more paved bike lanes that connect to other bike routes throughout the metropolitan area and the creation of Nice Ride Minnesota, a seasonally operated nonprofit bicycle sharing and rental system that has over 1,550 bicycles and 170 stations in both Minneapolis and St. Paul. Downtown St. Paul has a five-mile (8 km) enclosed skyway system over 25 city blocks. The  Avenue of the Saints connects St. Paul with St. Louis, Missouri.

The layout of city streets and roads has often drawn complaints. While he was Governor of Minnesota, Jesse Ventura appeared on the Late Show with David Letterman, and remarked that the streets were designed by "drunken Irishmen". He later apologized, though people had been complaining about the fractured grid system for more than a century by that point. Some of the city's road design is the result of the curve of the Mississippi River, hilly topography, conflicts between developers of different neighborhoods in the early city, and grand plans only half-realized. Outside of downtown, the roads are less confusing, but most roads are named, rather than numbered, increasing the difficulty for non-natives to navigate.

Mass transit

Metro Transit provides bus service and light rail in the Minneapolis–St. Paul area. The METRO Green Line is an  light rail line that connects downtown St. Paul to downtown Minneapolis with 14 stations in St. Paul. The Green Line runs west along University Avenue, through the University of Minnesota campus, until it links up and then shares stations with the METRO Blue Line in downtown Minneapolis. Construction began in November 2010 and the line began service on June 14, 2014. The Green Line averaged 42,500 rides per weekday in 2018. Planning is underway for the Riverview Corridor, a rail line that will connect downtown Saint Paul to the airport and Mall of America.

The METRO A Line opened in 2016 as Minneapolis–Saint Paul's first arterial bus rapid transit line. The A Line connects the Blue Line at 46th Street station to Rosedale Center with a connection at the Green Line Snelling Avenue station. Future METRO lines are planned that will serve Saint Paul with the B Line and E Line Line running primarily on arterial streets, and the Gold Line and Purple Line running primarily in their own right of way.

Railroad
Amtrak's Empire Builder between Chicago and Seattle stops twice daily in each direction at the newly renovated Saint Paul Union Depot. Ridership on the train increased about 6% from 2005 to over 505,000 in fiscal year 2007. A Minnesota Department of Transportation study found that increased daily service to Chicago should be economically viable, especially if it originates in St. Paul and does not experience delays from the rest of the western route of the Empire Builder. Saint Paul is the site of the Pig's Eye Yard, a major freight classification yard for Canadian Pacific Railway. As of 2003, the yard handled over 1,000 freight cars per day. Both Union Pacific and Burlington Northern Santa Fe run trains through the yard, though they are not classified at Pig's Eye. Burlington Northern Santa Fe operates the large Northtown Yard in Minneapolis, which handles about 600 cars per day. There are several other small yards located around the city.

Airports
Holman Airfield is across the river from downtown St. Paul. Lamprey Lake was there until the Army Corps of Engineers filled it with dredgings starting in the early 1920s. Northwest Airlines began initial operations from Holman in 1926. During WWII Northwest had a contract to install upgraded radar systems in B-24s, employing 5,000 at the airfield. After WWII, Holman Airfield competed with the Speedway Field for the Twin Cities' growing aviation industry and lost out in the end. Today Holman is a reliever airport run by the Metropolitan Airports Commission. It is home to Minnesota's Air National Guard and a flight training school and is tailored to local corporate aviation. There are three runways, with the Holman Field Administration Building and Riverside Hangar on the National Register of Historic Places. The historical importance of the original Northwest Airlines building was realized only after demolition commenced.

MSP serves 17 commercial passenger airlines and is the hub of Delta Air Lines, Mesaba Airlines and Sun Country Airlines.

Sister cities
Saint Paul's sister cities are:

 Changsha, China
 Ciudad Romero, El Salvador
 Culiacán, Mexico
 Djibouti City, Djibouti
 George, South Africa
 Manzanillo, Mexico
 Modena, Italy
 Mogadishu, Somalia
 Nagasaki, Japan (from 1955 – the oldest sister city in Japan)
 Neuss, Germany
 Novosibirsk, Russia
 Tiberias, Israel

Notable people

 Walter Abel (1898–1987), actor
 Claude Henry Allen (1899–1974), Minnesota state legislator and lawyer
 Loni Anderson (born 1946), actress
 Louie Anderson (1953–2022), comedian
 Wendell Anderson (1933–2016), U.S. senator
 Richard Arlen (1899–1976), actor
 Merrill Ashley (born 1950), ballet dancer and répétiteur
 Roger Awsumb (1928–2002), TV show host "Casey Jones"
 Azayamankawin (–), canoe ferry operator and entrepreneur known as "Old Bets"
 Ernest A. Beedle (1933–1968), Minnesota state legislator and lawyer
 Tony L. Bennett (1940–2022), Minnesota state legislator and police officer
 Harry Blackmun (1908–1999), U.S. Supreme Court associate justice, grew up in St. Paul
 Winfield S. Braddock (1848–1920), Wisconsin state assemblyman
 Justin Braun (born 1987), hockey player
 Herb Brooks (1937–2003), hockey coach
 Warren E. Burger (1907–1995), U.S. Supreme Court chief justice
 Margaret Mary Byrne (born 1949), Minnesota state legislator
 John T. Clawson (1945–2011), Minnesota state legislator and Lutheran minister
 Melva Clemaire (1874–1937), soprano singer
 Nia Coffey (born 1995), WNBA player
 Francis Roach Delano (1823–1887), state legislator
 Neil Dieterich (born 1943), state legislator and lawyer
 John Drew (1940–1997), Minnesota state legislator and businessman
 Robert Rankin Dunlap (1915–1992), state legislator and lawyer
 Kevin Eakin (born 1981), NFL player
 Leslie J. Edhlund (1911–1994), American politician and mechanical engineer
 Sarah K. England, physiologist and biophysicist
 Eyedea (1981–2010), rap artist
 Ray W. Faricy (born 1934), Minnesota state legislator and lawyer
 Robert J. Ferderer (1934–2009), politician and businessman
 F. Scott Fitzgerald (1896–1940), author
 George H. Gehan (1901–1968), state legislator and lawyer
 Michael J. George (1948–2010), state legislator and businessman
 Arthur T. Gibbons (1903–1986), state legislator and businessman
 Rollin Glewwe (1933–2020), state senator and businessman
 Conrad Gotzian (1835–1887), state legislator and merchant
 Karl F. Grittner (1922–2011), state legislator and educator
 William Sprigg Hall (1832–1875), state legislator and lawyer
 Daniel W. Hand (1869–1945), U.S. Army brigadier general
 Charles Robert Hansen (1909–2000), state senator and businessman
 Josh Hartnett (born 1978), actor
 Andrew Osborne Hayfield (1905–1981), businessman and state legislator
 Mitch Hedberg (1968–2005), comedian
 Hippo Campus, indie rock band
 Paul Holmgren (born 1955), NHL player, general manager, president of Philadelphia Flyers
 Nellie A. Hope (1864–1918), violinist, music teacher, orchestra conductor
 JoAnna James (born 1980), singer/songwriter
 Nick Jensen (born 1990), NHL player
 Timothy M. Kaine (born 1958), U.S. senator, governor of Virginia
 Rachel Keller (born 1992), actress
 Allan Kingdom (born 1993), rap artist
 Dick Kostohryz (1930–1994), police officer, businessman, and Minnesota state legislator
 Thomas K. Lane (born 1983), former Minneapolis police officer who assisted Derek Chauvin in the murder of George Floyd, born in St. Paul
 Jim Lange (1932–2014), TV presenter, game show host, and disc jockey
 Sunisa Lee (born 2003), Olympic gymnast and gold medalist
 Tony Levine (born 1972), football coach
 Joe Mauer (born 1983), MLB player
 Ryan McDonagh (born 1989), NHL player
 Robert O. McEachern (1927–2008), teacher and state legislator
 Margaret Bischell McFadden, philanthropist and social worker
 Edwin H. Meihofer (1907–2003), labor union activist and state representative
 Frederick P. Memmer (1907–1984), state legislator and lawyer
 Peter J. Memmer (1886–1957), state senator and businessman
 K'Andre Miller (born 2000), NHL player
 Kate Millett (1934–2017), scholar, author, feminist
 Paul Molitor (born 1956), MLB player
 Jack Morris (born 1955), MLB player
 LeRoy Neiman (1921–2012), artist
 Thomas Warren Newcome (1923–2011), lawyer and state representative
 Kyle Okposo (born 1988), NHL player
 Sally Olsen (1934–2022), lawyer and state legislator
 Bruce Olson (born 1941), missionary
 Joseph T. O'Neill (1931–2022), lawyer and state legislator
 Howard Orenstein (born 1955), state representative and lawyer
 Clifton T. Parks (1895–1976), state legislator and lawyer
 Tim Pawlenty (born 1960), governor of Minnesota
 Alfred E. Perlman (1902–1983), president of New York Central Railroad and its successor, Penn Central
 Walt Perlt (1927–2002), state representative
 Dave Peterson (1931–1997), teacher and coach of the United States men's national ice hockey team
 Anthony Podgorski (1903–1987), businessman and state representative
 Joseph L. Prifrel (1905–1997), state representative, furrier, and businessman
 Robert W. Reif (1921–2011), state representative and physician
 Isaac Rosefelt (born 1985), American-Israeli basketball player
 Charles M. Schulz (1922–2000), cartoonist, born in Minneapolis, grew up in St. Paul
 Ervin Harold Schulz (1911–1978), businessman, newspaper editor, state representative, grew up in Saint Paul
 Meta Schumann (1887-1937), composer
 Chad Smith (born 1961), drummer of the Red Hot Chili Peppers since 1988, born in Saint Paul
 William Smith (1831–1912), paymaster-general of the United States Army, worked in and retired to St. Paul
 Vernon L. Sommerdorf (1921–2009), state representative and physician
 Peter P. Stumpf Jr. (1948–2010), businessman and Minnesota state senator, born in Saint Paul
 Terrell Suggs, NFL player
 Dennis Mark Sullivan (1841–1917), businessman, Saint Paul City Council member, state representative
 Frances Tarbox (1874–1959), composer
 John D. Tomlinson (1929–1992), Minnesota state legislator and businessman
 Fred Tschida (born 1949), artist, born in Saint Paul
 Kathleen Vellenga (born 1938), Minnesota state legislator and educator
 Lindsey Vonn (born 1984), Olympic skier and gold medalist
 DeWitt Wallace (1889–1981), magazine publisher and co-founder of Reader's Digest
 Richard Ambrose Walsh (1862–1940), Minnesota state representative and lawyer
 Leslie L. Westin (1917–1985), American businessman, educator, and Minnesota state senator
 Dave Winfield (born 1951), MLB player

Medal of Honor recipients:
Civil War: Private Marshall Sherman, Co C 1st Minnesota captured the flag of the 28th Virginia Infantry at Gettysburg
Indian Wars: Pvt. John Tracy G Co. 8th Cavalry  Chiricahua Mountains, Arizona, Apache War
Indian Wars: Charles H. Welch, I Co. 9th Cavalry (Buffalo soldiers) Ghost Dance War
Spanish-American War: Captain Jesse Dyer USMC, Vera Cruz, Mexico
 World War II: Captain Richard Fleming USMC VMA-241 Squadron, for whom Fleming Field is named
Korean War: Lt. Colonel John Page, U.S. Army, Battle of Chosin Reservoir

See also

 Minneapolis–Saint Paul
 USS Saint Paul, 5 ships (including 2 as Minneapolis-Saint Paul)

References

External links

 
 Official Tourism site
 Lowertown: The Rise of an Urban Village – Documentary produced by Twin Cities PBS

 
1848 establishments in Wisconsin
Cities in Minnesota
Cities in Ramsey County, Minnesota
County seats in Minnesota
Minneapolis–Saint Paul
Minnesota populated places on the Mississippi River
Populated places established in 1848